Work Channel formerly Wark Channel is a channel in the North Coast region of the Canadian province of British Columbia. It lies to the northeast of the Tsimpsean Peninsula. It was named about 1837 by officers of the Hudson's Bay Company after John Work, born John Wark. It was first charted in 1793 by James Johnstone and Robert Barrie, two of George Vancouver's officers during his 1791-95 expedition.

References

Channels of British Columbia
North Coast of British Columbia